The German 23rd Infantry Division (23. Infanterie-Division), later the 26th Panzer Division, was a military unit operational during World War II.  It was organized along standard lines for a German infantry division. It was non-motorised and relied on horse-drawn wagons for its mobility. The unit carried the nickname Grenadierkopf.

The 23rd Infantry participated in the invasion of Poland in 1939 as part of the reserve component of the 4th Army.  The division was commanded by Walter Graf von Brockdorff-Ahlefeldt and consisted of the 9th, 67th, and 68th infantry regiments.

Commanding officers
Generalleutnant Ernst Busch, creation – 4 February 1938
General der Infanterie Walter Graf von Brockdorff-Ahlefeldt, 4 February 1938 – 1 June 1940
Generalleutnant Heinz Hellmich, 1 June 1940 – 17 January 1942
Generalleutnant Curt Badinski, 17 January 1942 – 9 July 1942

26th Panzer Division
In July 1942, the division was reorganized as the 26th Panzer Division (26. Panzer-Division). It then served occupation duties in the west until mid-1943, whereupon it transferred to Italy to resist the Allied invasion, fought at Salerno, and remained in Italy for the rest of the war, surrendering to the British near Bologna at the end.

Soldiers of the division, then commanded by Eduard Crasemann, were involved  in the Padule di Fucecchio massacre on 23 August 1944. Crasemann was sentenced to 10 years imprisonment for war crimes after the war and died in jail in West Germany in 1950.

Commanding officers
General der Panzertruppe Smilo Freiherr von Lüttwitz, 14 September 1942
Generalmajor Hans Hecker, 22 January 1944
General der Panzertruppe Smilo Freiherr von Lüttwitz, 20 February 1944
Oberst Dr. rer. pol. Dr. jur. Hans Boelsen, 11 April 1944 – 7 May 1944 (deputy)
Generalleutnant Eduard Crasemann, 6 July 1944
Oberst Carl Stollbrock, 15 December 1944 - 15 January 1945 (deputy)
Generalmajor Alfred Kuhnert, 29 January 1945
Generalleutnant Viktor Linnarz, 19 April 1945

New 23rd Infantry Division
In November 1942 a new 23rd Infantry Division was formed, with the new 9th and 67th regiments called Grenadier to distinguish them from the original 9th and 67th regiments now called Panzergrenadier in the 26th Panzer Division. This new division served on the Eastern Front for the remainder of the war, ultimately surrendering in East Prussia.

Commanding officers
Generalmajor Friedrich von Schellwitz, re-creation - August 1943
General der Artillerie Horst von Mellenthin, August 1943 - 1 September 1943
Generalleutnant Paul Gurran, 1 September 1943 - 22 February 1944
Generalleutnant Walter Chales de Beaulieu, 22 February 1944 - 1 August 1944
Generalleutnant Hans Schirmer, 1 August 1944 - disbanded

Officers of the 23rd Infantry Division/26th Panzer Division who conspired against Hitler 
Lieutenant Colonel Hasso von Boehmer 
Major Axel Freiherr von dem Bussche-Streithorst 
Captain Dr. Hans Fritzsche 
Lieutenant Colonel Helmuth von Gottberg 
Lieutenant Colonel Ludwig Freiherr von Hammerstein 
Lieutenant Colonel (res.) Carl-Hans Graf von Hardenberg 
Lieutenant General Paul von Hase 
Lieutenant Ewald Heinrich von Kleist 
Colonel Hans Otfried von Linstow 
Captain Friedrich Karl Klausing 
Major (res.) Ferdinand Freiherr von Lüninck 
Major (res.) Herbert Meyer 
Lieutenant Georg-Sigismund von Oppen 
Colonel Alexis Freiherr von Roenne 
Lieutenant Colonel (res.) Fritz-Dietlof von der Schulenburg
Lieutenant Colonel Gerd von Tresckow 
Major General Henning von Tresckow 
Lieutenant Colonel i. G. Hans-Alexander von Voß 
Captain (res.) Achim Freiherr von Willisen 
Captain (res.) Richard von Weizsäcker

See also
German order of battle for Operation Fall Weiss
List of German divisions in World War II
SS Panzer Division order of battle
Panzer division

References

 
 

0*023
Military units and formations established in 1934
1934 establishments in Germany
Military units and formations disestablished in 1945